The Evil (also known as Cry Demon and House of Evil) is a 1978 American supernatural horror film directed by Gus Trikonis and starring Richard Crenna, Joanna Pettet, Andrew Prine and Victor Buono. Its plot follows a husband-and-wife team of doctors who attempt to open a rehabilitation center in a mansion built over a gateway to hell.

Plot
Psychiatrist C.J. Arnold buys an abandoned mansion, once owned by a Civil War general named Emilio Vargas, which was built over hot sulfur pits. There, he plans to set up a drug rehab center. C.J. recruits a group of volunteers to help clean up and renovate the large house. Almost immediately, C.J.'s wife, Dr. Caroline Arnold, senses a presence that starts to manifest as a ghostly apparition. Soon thereafter, more strange and eerie things start to happen which start to agitate the volunteers, along with the resident dog.

Later on, C.J. discovers a trap door in the basement, which he opens up and unknowingly unleashes a menacing spirit. Suddenly, all of the doors and windows become locked, trapping everyone inside the mansion. They soon discover that the trap door in the basement is actually a gateway into Hell. While Felicia is sleeping, she is suddenly attacked by an invisible force that beats her and tears her clothing off. Her screams are heard by the others, who come to console her. The group attempts to find a way out of the house, and decides to scale the wall from a turret on the house. Peter attempts to descend using a rope but is overtaken by an invisible force. C.J. attempts to pull him back to safety, but the rope becomes inexplicably hot before Pete's body spontaneously combusts and falls to the ground.

Further attempts to escape are fruitless, including the men attempting to saw the door open with a skill saw, as the blade inexplicably wears down rapidly, inflicting no damage on the wood. While doing so, Raymond inadvertently saws through his own hand. Mary flees upstairs to retrieve bandages. The dog attacks her in the hallway, knocking them both over the staircase railing, causing them to fall to their deaths.

C.J. begins storing all of the deceased's bodies in an enclosed porch, but shortly after finds that Mary's body has vanished. Meanwhile, Caroline witnesses the apparition of a man motioning for her to pick up an iron cross in the parlor. When she does, the apparition vanishes. She subsequently finds C.J., Raymond, and Felicia standing over Mary's corpse in a trancelike state; when she appears with the cross, however, it drives the three into a fit, and they return to consciousness, unaware of what just occurred. A short time later, Laurie, Felicia, and Raymond attempt to melt the iron bars covering the windows with electrical cables. During the attempt, Laurie is dragged away upstairs by an unseen entity. Raymond chases after her but is thrown down the staircase by the force. In a panic, Raymond and Felicia resume their endeavor, but Felicia is killed when Mary's corpse reanimates, startling her and causing her to fall back against the iron bars, electrocuting her to death.

The electricity causes the bars in one of the windows to melt, and Raymond leaps through the window. As he runs away from the house, however, the ground beneath him turns to quicksand, and he sinks into the mud, drowning. Meanwhile, Caroline becomes possessed by Vargas, whose apparition she has repeatedly seen; Vargas, using Caroline's body as a conduit, tells C.J. he has released "the evil" in the house by unlocking the pit. Vargas reveals that prior to C.J and Caroline coming to the house with their group, Vargas was forced to claim a life of an innocent person as a warning to others to stay away from the mansion but obviously the warning was not heeded, leaving the death of Vargas' victim in vain. Together, C.J and Caroline descend into the basement to close the pit, but are overcome by a powerful force that knocks Caroline into the pit. C.J. descends into the pit to get her, and the two find a series of tunnels. There, C.J. enters a white cavern, where he is confronted by the Devil, who threatens and belittles C.J. as the Devil proceeds to break C.J.'s mind. Caroline appears with the cross, stabbing it into the Devil's chest, and together she and C.J. flee, escaping the pit and sealing it closed. When they do, the windows and doors of the house miraculously unlock. They flee outside while Vargas' spirit watches from a window.

Cast

Location
The movie was filmed at Montezuma Castle.

Release
The Evil was released theatrically in the spring of 1978, with screenings beginning on March 8 in San Francisco.

Critical response
Variety reviewed the film favorably, writing that the film has a "psychological insight [that] is rare in suspensers, and is a credit to both Crenna, who delivers a strong performance, and director Gus Trikonis. Fulcrum of pic’s success or failure comes in final scenes, when Crenna and Pettet confront the devil himself, played with sinister angelicism by Victor Buono." Linda Gross of the Los Angeles Times deemed the film "a scary and atmospheric thriller" with "excruciating suspense," also praising the performances and music. Bob Keaton of the Fort Lauderdale News noted the plot as "familiar," but conceded that "for those who enjoy the genre, The Evil is just their cup of horror."

Patrick Taggart of the Austin American-Statesman was less laudatory of the film, characterizing it as "yet another horror movie set in an old mansion...  The actors seem absolutely bored to death, as you likely will be after 20 minutes' worth of viewing...  Gus Trikonis directed with a flair that elevated tedium to the level of religion." Daniel Ruth of The Tampa Tribune was also critical of the film, writing that "the film is about as original as a room at the Holiday Inn...  It is a film that stretches the limits of tastelessness with gratuitous displays of blood-letting for the sake of pursuing obtuse theological questions of right versus wrong, good versus evil."

See also
 List of ghost films

Notes

References

External links
 
 
 

1978 films
1978 horror films
American supernatural horror films
1970s English-language films
Films set in country houses
Films shot in New Mexico
American ghost films
American haunted house films
The Devil in film
1970s exploitation films
1970s supernatural horror films
American exploitation films
Films directed by Gus Trikonis
1970s ghost films
1970s American films